Hortoneda is a locality located in the municipality of Clariana de Cardener, in Province of Lleida province, Catalonia, Spain. As of 2020, it has a population of 39.

Geography 
Hortoneda is located 114km east-northeast of Lleida.

References

Populated places in the Province of Lleida